Alexander (Alex) "Spunk" Pitko (November 22, 1914 – August 1, 2011) was a backup outfielder in Major League Baseball who played for the Philadelphia Phillies (1938) and Washington Senators (1939). Born in Burlington, New Jersey, he batted and threw right-handed.

In a two-season career, Pitko was a .259 hitter (7-for-27) with three RBI, two runs, one double, and one stolen base without home runs in 11 games played.

External links
Baseball Reference
Alex Pitko's obituary

Philadelphia Phillies players
Washington Senators (1901–1960) players
Major League Baseball outfielders
People from Burlington, New Jersey
Sportspeople from Burlington County, New Jersey
1914 births
2011 deaths
Baseball players from New Jersey